Ōgi Station is the name of multiple train stations in Japan:

 Ōgi Station (Hyōgo) (青木駅)
 Ogi Station, a railway station on the Karatsu Line in Ogi, Saga Prefecture, Japan
 Ōgi Station (Saga), a railway station on the Matsuura Railway in Arita, Saga Prefecture, Japan

See also
 Ogi Station